El Hadjira is a district in Ouargla Province, Algeria. It was named after its capital, El Hadjira. As of the 2008 census, the district had a total population of 22,474.

Communes
The district is further divided into 2 communes:
El Hadjira
El Allia

References

Districts of Ouargla Province